Saad Sport Club is an Iraqi football team based in Ad-Dawr, Saladin, that plays in Iraq Division Three.

History

Lower divisions
Saad SC was founded on 5 November 1989 and admitted to the Iraq Division Three (fourth-tier of Iraqi football) after the withdrawal of one of the teams in that division. Saad won the Division Three and Division Two titles consecutively, and in the 1991–92 season they won the Iraq Division One title by beating Wahid Huzairan 1–0 in the final, securing promotion to the Iraqi Premier League.

In Premier League
Saad SC team played in the Iraqi Premier League for the first time in the 1992–93 season, and in that season the club's name was changed and played under the name (Al-Dawr Al-Ahli), and the team was not good enough, and with a strange decision, the team was excluded from the league, and was replaced by Sulaymaniya after 46 games, with Sulaymaniya adopting the results obtained by Al-Dawr Al-Ahli up to that point, and eventually relegated to the Iraq Division One.

Managerial history

  Nihad Ghazi 
  Dhiaa Hussein

Famous players
Rahim Bakr

Honours

Iraq Division One
Winners (1): 1991–92
Iraq Division Two
Winners (1): 1990–91
Iraq Division Three
Winners (1): 1989–90

References

External links
 Saad (Al-Dawr Al-Ahli) SC on Goalzz.com
 Iraq Clubs- Foundation Dates

1989 establishments in Iraq
Association football clubs established in 1989
Football clubs in Saladin